is a Japanese politician serving as the Minister of Digital Affairs of Japan since August 2022. A member of the Liberal Democratic Party, he previously served as Minister for Administrative Reform and Regulatory Reform from 2015 to 2016 and from 2020 to 2021, and was the Minister for Foreign Affairs and Minister of Defense under Prime Minister Shinzo Abe. He is also a member of the House of Representatives representing Kanagawa's 15th district since 1996.

Kono has developed a reputation as a political maverick, with a tendency to hold positions on issues contrary to his party. He is also known for his large following on social media and his fluency in English, having attended college in the United States. He also has been speculated as a potential future Prime Minister, running in the 2021 Liberal Democratic Party leadership election, but losing to Fumio Kishida in a second round run-off.

Early life
Taro Kono was born on 10 January 1963, in Hiratsuka, Kanagawa, the oldest of the three children of Yōhei Kōno, a former President of the Liberal Democratic Party and Speaker of the House of Representatives. He was born into a family of politicians: his father, his grandfather Ichirō Kōno, and his great-uncle Kenzō Kōno (Speaker of the House of Councillors between 1971 and 1977), were all active in Japanese politics.

Kono attended Hanamizu Elementary School, Keio Middle School, and then Keio Senior High School. In 1981, he entered Keiō University to study economics but dropped out in order to study in the United States.

In 1982, he went to the United States, where he attended the Suffield Academy and Georgetown University, and studied comparative politics. In 1983, he worked for Senator Alan Cranston in his campaign for the Democratic Party presidential nomination. He also worked for then Representative Richard Shelby of Alabama (at the time a Democrat) for two years. He also spent time at the Warsaw School of Economics, Poland, during which he spent a night in prison after visiting the home of Solidarity leader, Lech Wałęsa.

Kono graduated from Georgetown University in 1985 with a Bachelor of Science in Foreign Service and the following year he joined Fuji Xerox. He moved to Fuji Xerox Asia Pacific in Singapore in 1991. In 1993, he joined  (日本端子), a supplier of electric components for Toyota, General Motors, Matsushita, and other companies.

Political career
Kono was first elected to the House of Representatives of Japan as a Liberal Democratic member in the October 1996 general election, at age 33. He won a closely contested election in the newly created Kanagawa 15th district covering the cities of Hiratsuka and Chigasaki, adjacent to his father's constituency in the Kanagawa 17th district (Odawara and Hadano). He has since been re-elected six times in 2000, 2003, 2005, 2009, 2012 and 2014, respectively. His winning majority increased from 13,297 in 1996 to 63,058 in 2000, 71,968 in 2003, and 103,280 in 2005. The total number of votes he received in 2005 was 186,770, the second largest number in Japan's electoral history (second only to then Prime Minister Koizumi's total in the same election).

Kono has been a member of five standing committees of the House of Representatives: Economy; Environment; Health, Labour, & Welfare; Trade & Industry; and Finance. In addition, he has been a member of two special committees: Consumer Affairs, and Children & Youth Affairs.

Koizumi government 
From January to October 2002, Kono was Parliamentary Secretary for Public Management, responsible for administrative reforms, local governments, and "e-government." From November 2005 to September 2006 he was Senior Vice Minister of Justice in Koizumi's government.

In October 2002, Kono was named Director of the Foreign Affairs Committee of the House of Representatives. He resigned from this position two months later in protest over the Iraq War, accusing Foreign Minister Kawaguchi of not adequately explaining the government's policy.

Kono was the Acting Chairman of the Liberal Democratic Party Committee until November 2003 and was one of the few members of the LDP to oppose the dispatch of the Japan Self-Defense Forces to Iraq.

In 2004, Kono, then 41, was appointed Assistant Secretary-General of the Liberal Democratic Party, and was also elected Prefectural Chairman of the Liberal Democratic Party in Kanagawa Prefecture. He was the youngest Prefectural Chairman in the LDP. In 2005, he led the Party in Kanagawa in the general election.

In 2004, Kono co-sponsored the Economic Sanction Amendment to the Foreign Exchange Law, which gives the government power to unilaterally declare economic sanctions on any state; and the Port Closure Bill, which allows the government to refuse the entry of foreign ships from Japanese ports. His website states that "North Korea was the target." He also sponsored a United Nations Reform Bill that would have required the government to reduce its voluntary contributions to the UN Systems by 10 percent each year until changes were made in the membership of the Security Council.

Kono resigned as head of the Kanagawa LDP following the 2007 local elections, in which the LDP-supported candidate Tadashi Sugino lost to incumbent Shigefumi Matsuzawa. He became head of the House of Representatives Foreign Affairs Committee in September 2008. He ran for President of the LDP in 2009, but was defeated by Sadakazu Tanigaki.

Kono replaced Hiroyuki Sonoda as Deputy Secretary-General of the LDP in April 2010, after Sonoda left the party to join the Sunrise Party of Japan.

Abe government 

In October 2015, Kono joined the Third Abe Cabinet as Chairman of the National Public Safety Commission, Minister in charge of Administrative Reform, Minister in charge of Civil Service Reform, Minister of State for Consumer Affairs and Food Safety, Minister of State for Regulatory Reform and Minister of State for Disaster Management. In this role, he was responsible for coordinating security measures for the 2016 G7 summit. He left the cabinet in a reshuffle in August 2016.

Abe named Kono Foreign Minister on 3 August 2017, replacing Fumio Kishida, who had served in that role since 2012 and had rarely publicly disagreed with Abe. Kono was chosen over Katsunobu Kato, after lengthy deliberation, for his superior English ability and his grasp of international issues, despite having a reputation as an outspoken and sometimes "eccentric" politician. Foreign media reports considered Kono to be more dovish compared to Abe, and expected him to take a softer diplomatic approach to foreign policy. Many analysts were particularly optimistic that Kono would adopt his father's friendly attitude toward China.

As foreign minister, Kono was responsible for coordinating Japan's response to the North Korean crisis. He publicly urged countries to cut diplomatic and economic ties with North Korea following the announcement of enhanced sanctions by the US government in September 2017. Kono also reportedly pressed Iranian foreign minister Javad Zarif to increase Iranian pressure on North Korea. Kono's father publicly criticized the government's approach to the crisis, claiming that it should be more cooperative with the Chinese government.

Late in the evening of 15 April 2018 in the flurry of exchanges after the tripartite missile strikes on Syria, Foreign Minister Kono received the first official visit from the Chinese counterpart since November 2009. The Chinese Foreign Minister Wang Yi visited for several days during the leadup to Prime Minister of Japan Shinzo Abe's visit to President Trump later that month. Kono was the first Japanese FM to host an official Chinese FM visit for nearly a decade.

Kono's past business, as well as political ties to the United States, make him very appealing to serve as Foreign Minister. Abe said of Kono appointment, "He has been to the United States many times and made friends there. He has also had exchanges with American politicians. I'm sure he'll serve (as minister) with an understanding of how to strengthen the Japan-U.S. alliance". Prime Minister Abe has made it explicitly clear that by appointing Kono to the position of Foreign Minister, he was trying to strengthen the already formidable Japanese American alliance. Kono's appointment to Foreign Minister has also been well received by Japan's surrounding neighbors”. Some Foreign Ministry officials say the appointment of Kono will be viewed favorably by China and South Korea.

As the foreign minister at the time, he was considered a leading figure behind a trade dispute with South Korea although he was considered friendly with the country. He is also known as a leading figure of cancellation of Aegis ashore project.

Suga government 
Incoming Prime Minister Yoshihide Suga moved Kono back to the position of Minister of State for Administrative Reform, while tapping Abe's younger brother Nobuo Kishi to succeed Kono as defense minister. Nikkei described Kono as Suga's "point man for cutting red tape," as Suga announced that government waste and sectionalism would be addressed by Kono's team. Suga used Kono’s new position as “drastic medicine” in an attempt to show his seriousness in the position. Commentator Michael Bosack described this post as a "downgrade" and "tantamount to a demotion," citing Kono's ambition to become prime minister as well as poor coordination of decisions with the party. On 18 January 2021, Suga announced that Kono would be in charge of overseeing the Japanese administration of the COVID-19 vaccine.

2021 Liberal Democratic leadership election 

On 3 September 2021, Kono announced his candidacy for the Liberal Democratic Party leadership in the 2021 election. Following the surprise resignation announcement by Prime Minister Suga that day, Japanese media reported that Kono was Suga's first choice for a successor. However, according to journalist Kenji Goto, Deputy Prime Minister Taro Aso, who led Kono's faction in the Diet, did not support Kono's candidacy, viewing it as too early.

He faced backlash for blocking those who criticized him during the election cycle. He stated that this was an attempt to protect himself from online abuse. The trend "Blocked by Mr. Kono" was trending as a result.

On 29 September, Kono made it into the second round run off with Fumio Kishida, and lost with 170 votes to Kishida's 257 votes. Kishida subsequently appointed Kono to be the LDP's Public Relations chief.

Electoral history 
Kono was first elected to the House of Representatives in 1996 representing Kanagawa 15th district, at the age of thirty-three years old. Kono is a very popular candidate winning Kanagawa's 15th district seat in seven consecutive elections.

In the 2000 Lower House Elections, Kono achieved reelection by winning 120,001 votes, which was good for 47.4 percent of the votes cast in his district.

In the 2003 Lower House Elections, Kono received 125,067 votes, which accounted for 55.4 percent of the votes cast in his district.

In the 2005 Lower House Elections, Kono won 186,770 votes, or 63.9 percent of the votes cast in his district.

In the 2009 Lower House Elections, Kono received 163,470 votes, which was good for 53.3 percent of the votes cast in his district.

Kono has fared well in his last two elections, winning re-election by overwhelming margins. In 2012, Kono received 192,604 votes winning over eighty percent of the vote in his district. This is an overwhelming margin of victory. In 2014, Kono did not win by quite as large of a margin. In 2014, Kono received 155,388 votes, which yielded him 68 percent of the vote in his district. Nevertheless, Kono received a large number of votes and won elections by sweeping margins.

Policy views
Kono is commonly dubbed as a political "maverick" and known for expressing his views on politically sensitive issues. Unlike former Prime Minister Shinzo Abe and most of his cabinet, Kono is not affiliated with the ultra-conservative organization Nippon Kaigi.

Domestic policy

Taro Kono supports legalising same-sex marriage and allowing married couples to have separate surnames.

He established a House subcommittee on genetically modified organisms in 1997 and supported new labeling rules on GMOs.

He opposes the government's nuclear policy, especially plans to pursue the nuclear fuel cycle and to build new power stations. Before serving as Foreign Minister, Kono was on record as saying he would like the Japanese Government to curtail its reliance on nuclear energy going forward. He specifically opposed Government plans to build new nuclear reactors. Kono also believes Japan needs to be more prudent about the dangers of nuclear energy in the aftermath of the Fukushima Nuclear Explosion by limiting the number of years already operational nuclear stations are free to operate, "Kono has said he wants Japan to commit to phasing out nuclear power by shutting down reactors when they reach 40 years of service, contrasting the government’s policy of maintaining its nuclear reactors as a core energy source". Kono believes that nuclear explosions and contamination are not the only dangers that result from Japan's reliance on nuclear energy: "We've been depending on the nuclear energy so much,"... "It's not the policy choice. It's because of those bureaucrats and the power company and the politician got some vested interest in promoting nuclear". Following his appointment as Foreign Minister on 3 August 2017, Kono has taken a partisan approach to nuclear energy policies. On 7 October 2015, he was asked at his inaugural news conference whether he would retain his criticism of Abe’s nuclear policy, Kono said he was "going in the same direction" as his boss.

Kono has said that he would not visit Yasukuni Shrine if he was ever made prime minister, although he visits the shrine at present because he has relatives who died in the war. Kono believes that the best way for Japan to limit political backlash from their surrounding neighbors is to build a new shrine, "Kono said he supported building a new national memorial to honor the war dead, saying it would make it easier for the Emperor and the prime minister to pay their respects". Kono believes that building a new shrine will de-escalate tension from Japan's neighbors over Japan's prime minister visiting the current shrine, which honors 14 Class-A-War criminals. The Japanese Emperor does not currently visit Yasukuni Shrine.

He has supported raising the consumption tax rate to 8 percent, with the funds to be directed towards the National Pension.

Kono advocates for more immigration, having criticized the government's resistance to opening the door to immigrants in order to mitigate Japan's labor shortage as a result of its aging and shrinking population.

In March 2019, Kono publicly made the proposal to end the common practice of expressing Japanese names in English or other foreign languages in the Western way, i.e. given name followed by family name, and to return to the Japanese traditional practice of putting the family name first. He stated that the start of the new Reiwa Japanese era name and the coming 2020 Summer Olympics to be held in Japan provide timely opportunities for initiating a reversal. Japan adopted on its own initiative the Western way of expressing names at the end of the 19th century, under the initiative of Meiji era reformers..

In August 2020, Kono defended that matrilineal emperors, whose fathers have no bloodline connection with past emperors, should be considered to maintain stable succession of the Imperial Throne. He further proposed that it should be "possible that Imperial princesses (children or grandchildren of an emperor), including Princess Aiko (the daughter of Emperor Naruhito), could be accepted as the next emperor. He argued that under the current succession rules it would be difficult to allure any potential bride for the male heir, who would face enormous psychological pressure to become pregnant with a boy. Kono also questioned a proposal suggested by some conservative members of the Liberal Democratic Party to reinstate members of former Imperial branch households to maintain patrilineal lineage succession, saying, "There will be a need to have discussions whether the people of Japan will truly accept reinstating those who were separated from the Imperial Family some 600 years ago."

Foreign policy
Kono is considered to be an Asia-Centrist and has strong and friendly ties with the United States. Kono has long been an emphatic proponent of reinvigorating the alliance between South Korea and Japan, stating "We need an Asia-Centric policy that considers at the same time Japan's national interests and the interests of surrounding nations, and the focus of that is between Japan and Korea". The fixation on Asia-Centrism by Kono directly contrasts with the stance of most LDP politicians, who heavily stress Japan's relationship with the United States of America. Kono would like to entwine a greater business and economic relationship between the two nations. Kono is on record as saying, "I understand the problem as one in which Korea and Japan must pool their strength so that they might survive in the changing global environment". Kono has taken several steps to forging a more vigorous relationship between Japan and Korea. Kono co-sponsored a bill which now allows direct air service between Gimpo, South Korea and Haneda airport in Tokyo. Kono hopes that the direct flight between the two popular cities will make for easier travel by businessmen voyaging between the nations. Kono hopes that the less-restrictive travel process will give rise to increased commerce between the two nations. Kono, however, still believes there is much more work to be done to help generate more commerce between the two nations. Kono would like to see the extension of short terms visas up to three months from Korean nationals doing business in Japan. He is the only Japanese lawmaker who runs a Korean webpage, and provides internships to Korean nationals. One of his Korean interns went on to become the Consul-General of South Korea in Kobe.

Kono has neither endorsed nor rejected his father's famous Kono Statement, which acknowledged the Japanese military's use of comfort women during World War II.

He supports amendment of Article 9 of the Japanese Constitution, allowing the Self-Defense Forces to engage in warfare. He supports the Japan-U.S. Security Treaty, but seeks revision of the Status of Forces Agreement (SOFA) On the issue of the U.S. Marine Corps Air Station in the Okinawan city of Futenma, Kono's "off the record" views "conflict with the official Japanese position."

He opposes donation of development aid to any countries that have failed to ratify the Comprehensive Nuclear-Test-Ban Treaty.

Personal life
Kono is married to Kaori, also a returnee (Kikokushijo) who had studied in Australia. The couple has a son, Ippei, born in 2002. The couple enjoy scuba diving and going to the movies.

In 2002, when his father, Yōhei Kōno, fell ill from a chronic hepatitis C infection, Kono offered a part of his liver for donation. His father initially refused the offer, but eventually relented and accepted; in April 2002, Kono donated part of his liver to his father  in a 15-hour operation. Kono has since supported changes to the law regarding organ donation.

He has become involved in a number of bodies managing professional sports. He is Chairman of Shonan Bellmare, a professional football club, and of the Japan Race Horse Association, which organizes Japan's largest yearling sales. He is also President of the Kanagawa Triathlon Union, the Kanagawa Track and Field Association, and the Hiratsuka Baseball Association. He teaches a graduate class at Hosei University.

Kono's favorite food is durian. He was named the Honorary Chairman of the Japan Durian Promotion Association when it was established in January 2020.

References

External links

Official website 

1963 births
21st-century Japanese politicians
Fuji Xerox
Georgetown University alumni
Japanese football chairmen and investors
Liberal Democratic Party (Japan) politicians
Living people
Members of the House of Representatives (Japan)
Organ transplant donors
People from Hiratsuka, Kanagawa
United States congressional aides
Foreign ministers of Japan
Japanese defense ministers
Politicians from Kanagawa Prefecture